Sangam is a 1964  romantic film, directed, produced and edited by Raj Kapoor at R. K. Studio, written by Inder Raj Anand, and distributed by R. K. Films with Mehboob Studio and Filmistan. The film stars Raj Kapoor, Vyjayanthimala and Rajendra Kumar in the lead roles, with Iftekhar, Raj Mehra, Nana Palsikar, Lalita Pawar, Achala Sachdev and Hari Shivdasani appearing in supporting roles. It was the first Indian film to be exclusively shot abroad and was also among the most expensive film of its time with the longest runtime for an Indian film up to that time. All this immensely contributing to the commercial success of the film.

Internationally the film released in the Soviet Union in 1964 and Turkey in 1968, as well as Bulgaria, Greece and Hungary. Director Dasari Narayana Rao remade the film in Telugu and Kannada languages as Swapna (1981). The film also remade in Turkish as Arkadaşımın Aşkısın (1968).

Plot summary
Sundar, Gopal and Radha have been friends since childhood. As they grow into adults, Sundar develops an obsessive romantic attraction to Radha; for him, she is the only woman in the world. However, Radha prefers Gopal, who is also in love with her, and systematically resists Sundar's advances. Matching Sundar's great love for Radha is his unswerving devotion to his friendship with Gopal. Sundar confides his feelings for Radha to Gopal, who decides to sacrifice his love for his friend's sake.

Eventually, Sundar enlists in the Indian Air Force and is assigned a dangerous mission in Kashmir, delivering items to soldiers fighting there. Before leaving, he extracts a promise from Gopal, whom he trusts implicitly, never to let any man come between Radha and himself while he is away. Sundar subsequently completes his mission, but his aircraft is shot down and he is listed as killed in action and presumed dead. For his bravery, he is awarded the Param Vir Chakra. The news saddens Radha and Gopal, but they are nonetheless now free to profess their love for one another. Among other expressions of love, Gopal writes her an unsigned love letter that touches her and which she hides away. Just when they begin taking steps to be married, Sundar returns, safe and sound. The self-effacing Gopal sacrifices his love once more, stepping back into the shadows and watching as the reborn Sundar resumes his wooing of Radha. Before Sundar enlisted, Radha's parents did not like him, but after he was awarded the Param Vir Chakra, they happily marry their daughter to him.

After the couple returns from an extended European honeymoon, Sundar is deliriously happy, as his life's dream has been realised. Radha is resolved to be faithful to her husband and to put Gopal out of her mind, privately asking him to stay away from her and Sundar because of the torture his presence causes her. Sundar's devotion to Gopal, however, is such that he constantly tries to draw him into their lives, much to Radha's chagrin. The perfection of their marital bliss is, however, shattered when Sundar accidentally discovers the unsigned love letter Gopal had written to Radha. An enraged Sundar pulls a pistol on his wife and demands she divulge the name of her supposed lover, threatening to kill the man, but she refuses.

In the days that follow, Sundar becomes consumed with discovering the identity of the letter's author. Radha's life becomes miserable, lived out against the incessant drama of Sundar's jealousy, threats, anger, and fixation with the letter. Eventually unable to bear the wretchedness of her existence with Sundar any further, she flees to Gopal for help. Sundar takes the same route, unaware that Radha has gone to Gopal's house. There, matters come to a head. The overwrought Gopal admits his authorship of the infamous letter to Radha, an admission that almost destroys his friend. Gopal, perceiving no exit from the impasse at which the three have arrived, kills himself with Sundar's pistol. Radha and Sundar are finally reunited but in mourning.

Cast
 Raj Kapoor as Flight Lt. Sundar Khanna
 Vyjayanthimala as Radha Mehra / Radha Sundar Khanna
 Rajendra Kumar as Magistrate Gopal Verma
 Iftekhar as Indian Air Force Officer
 Raj Mehra as Judge Mehra
 Nana Palsikar as Nathu
 Lalita Pawar as Mrs. Verma
 Hari Shivdasani as Captain
 Achala Sachdev as Captain's wife
 Randhir Kapoor as Young Sundar Khanna

Production

Development
In the late 1940s, Raj Kapoor planned to launch a film under the title of Gharonda with Dilip Kumar, Nargis and himself in the lead playing the central characters. The story was penned by Inder Raj Anand during the making of Kapoor's first directorial film, Aag (1948). However, the film was postponed for several reasons and was in development hell until 1962, when it was titled as Sangam, with new cast and crew.

Casting
Initially, Kapoor approached Dilip Kumar to play the role of Gopal Verma. Kumar agreed to play either one of the two male roles, on the condition that he be given the right to edit the final copy of the film. Since Kapoor could not accept Kumar's condition, he then approached Dev Anand and offered him the choice of either one of the male leads. The latter also declined the film, citing call sheet problems as the reason. Raj Kapoor then offered the role to Uttam Kumar but he too declined the offer. The role was finally given to Rajendra Kumar. Nargis was to appear in the film as well, but she refused, as her relationship with Raj Kapoor had just ended. Furthermore, she did not want to appear in the role of Rajendra Kumar's lover, having played his mother several years before in Mother India. Therefore, Vyjayanthimala was cast in the female lead role.

Filming
During filming, Raj Kapoor took the help of the Indian Air Force in the shooting of the Air Force scenes. This was also Raj Kapoor's first complete film in colour, and his last major hit as a lead actor.

Soundtrack
The music for this film was composed by Shankar Jaikishan, while the songs were written by Shailendra and Hasrat Jaipuri. The soundtrack was listed by Planet Bollywood as number 8 on their list of 100 Greatest Bollywood Soundtracks. Vyjayantimala made her debut as a singer by beautifully humming to the tunes of "Yeh Mera Prem Patra", along with Mohammed Rafi.

The song 'Har Dil Jo Pyaar Karega' was envisioned as a song sung by Lata Mangeshkar, Mukesh and Mohammed Rafi. However, Rafi and Mangeshkar were not on talking terms with each other during this period. Therefore, Mahendra Kapoor sung the portions which were lip-synced by Rajendra Kumar in this song.

Reception

Commercial response
Sangam was a success at the box office. Boxofficeindia.com reported the film had collected 80,000,000 and its net collection, 40,000,000. Contrary to both reports, Ibosnetwork.com claim that Sangam grossed around 50,000,000 with its adjusted to inflation gross to be . By the end of its overall box office collection, Sangam was labelled as blockbuster at the box office, where it was the highest-grossing film of the year.

The film was also ranked at fourth by Boxofficeindia.co.in in their 2011 list of "Top 50 Film of Last 50 Years", which feature all-time highest grossing Hindi films by using the relative price of gold in different years to arrive at a hypothetical current value of box office collections of past films.

Awards

See also
Buddha Mil Gaya of the film.

References

External links
 
 
 
Sangam

1964 films
Indian aviation films
1960s Hindi-language films
Films shot in Switzerland
Films shot in Paris
Films directed by Raj Kapoor
Films scored by Shankar–Jaikishan
1960s Urdu-language films
Hindi films remade in other languages
Urdu-language Indian films